Events from the 1590s in the Spanish Netherlands and Prince-bishopric of Liège.

Incumbents

Habsburg Netherlands
Monarch
 Philip II, King of Spain and Duke of Brabant, of Luxembourg, etc. to September 1598
 Isabella Clara Eugenia and Albert VII, Archduke of Austria, as co-sovereigns from September 1598.

Governor General
 Alexander Farnese, Duke of Parma, to 1592 
 Peter Ernst I von Mansfeld-Vorderort 1592–1594
 Archduke Ernest of Austria 1594–1595
 Pedro Henriquez de Acevedo, Count of Fuentes, acting governor general 1595–1596
 Albert VII, Archduke of Austria 1596–1598
 Margrave Andrew of Burgau, acting governor general 1598–1599

Prince-Bishopric of Liège
Prince-Bishop
 Ernest of Bavaria

Events
1590
 4 March – Loss of Breda

1591

1592
 28 May – Diocesan Seminary of Liège opens

1593

1594
 Joyous Entry into Brussels and Antwerp of Archduke Ernest of Austria

1595
 7 to 20 March – Siege of Huy
 14 October – Loss and retaking of Lier

1596
 24 April – Taking of Calais
 23 May – Taking of Ardres

1597
 24 January – Battle of Turnhout

1598
 2 May – Peace of Vervins concluded

1599
 18 April – Marriage of  Isabella Clara Eugenia and Albert VII, Archduke of Austria
 5 September – Joyous Entry into Brussels of Isabella Clara Eugenia and Albert VII, Archduke of Austria, as co-sovereigns

Births
1590
 Jacques Backereel
 Frederik Bouttats the Elder
 Christophe Butkens
 Andries van Eertvelt
 Hubertus Reulandt
 Daniel Seghers
 Caesar Joachim Trognaesius
1591
 Jacques Fouquier
 Nicolas Régnier
 Jan Roos (painter)
 Johannes Chrysostomus vander Sterre
 Johann von Werth
1592
 Balthasar Cordier
 Balthazar Gerbier
 Pieter Snayers
 Jean de Wachtendonck
 Cornelis de Wael
 Lucas de Wael
1593
 Adriaen de Bie
1594
 
1595
 
1596

1597
 
1598
 
1599

Deaths
1590

1591
 
1592
 
1593
 
1594
 
1595
 20 February - Archduke Ernest of Austria
1596
 4 January - Cristóbal de Mondragón
1597
 
1598
 
1599

References

 
1590s in the Holy Roman Empire